Sydney-Phillip was an electoral district of the Legislative Assembly in the Australian state of New South Wales. It was located in central Sydney and named after Arthur Phillip. It was created in 1894 from part of South Sydney. It was in the area surrounding central railway station area, bounded by Liverpool Street in the north, Elizabeth Street in the east, Cleveland Street in the south, while the western boundary consisted of Newtown Road, George Street West and George Street. In 1904 it was largely replaced by Phillip.

Members for Sydney-Phillip

Election results

References

Former electoral districts of New South Wales
Constituencies established in 1894
1894 establishments in Australia
Constituencies disestablished in 1904
1904 disestablishments in Australia